Éric Berger (born 13 June 1969) is a French actor. He appeared in more than forty films since 1991.

Selected filmography

References

External links 

1969 births
Living people
French male film actors